Michaela Wenig (born 14 June 1992) is a German former World Cup alpine ski racer, specializing in Super-G.

She competed at the World Championships in 2019.

World Cup results

Season standings

Top ten finishes
 0 podiums 
 1 top ten

World Championship results

References

External links

 Michaela Wenig World Cup standings at the International Ski Federation
 
 German Ski Team (DSV) – Michaela Wenig – 
  

1992 births
Living people
German female alpine skiers
People from Bad Tölz
Sportspeople from Upper Bavaria
21st-century German women